The Diary of a Cross-Stealer (Խաչագողի հիշատակարանը / Khachagoghi Hishatakarane) is an 1890 novel by the Armenian novelist Raffi. It was translated into Russian as Дневник крестокрада.

The Diary of the Cross Stealer was made into an Armenian film in 2010 (ru), directed by Hrach Keshishyan to a script by Artak Arzumanyan and starring Babken Chnobanyan as the titular con-man and with the theme song sung by Hayko.

References

1890 novels
Novels by Raffi
Armenian-language novels